In serial fiction, the term "reboot" signifies a new start to an established fictional universe, work, or series. A reboot discards continuity to re-create its characters, plotlines and backstory from the beginning. It has been described as a way to "rebrand" or "restart an entertainment universe that has already been established".

Another definition of a reboot is a remake which is part of an established film series or other media franchise. The term has been criticized for being a vague and "confusing" "buzzword", and a neologism for remake, a concept which has been losing popularity since the 2010s. William Proctor proposes that there is a distinction between reboots, remakes and retcons.

Origin
The term is thought to originate from the computing term reboot, meaning to restart a computer system. There is a change in meaning: the computing term refers to restarting the same program unaltered, while the term discussed here refers to revising a narrative from the beginning. The first known use of reboot applied to an entertainment franchise was in a 1994 Usenet posting.

Types

Reboots cut out non-essential elements associated with a pre-established franchise and start it anew, distilling it down to the core elements that made the source material popular. For audiences, reboots allow easier entry for newcomers unfamiliar with earlier titles in a series.

Comic books
In comic books, a long-running title may have its continuity erased to start over from the beginning, enabling writers to redefine characters and open up new story opportunities, allowing the title to bring in new readers. Comic books sometimes use an in-universe explanation for a reboot, such as merging parallel worlds and timelines together, or destroying a fictional universe and recreating it from the beginning.

Film
With reboots, filmmakers revamp and reinvigorate a film series to attract new fans and stimulate revenue. A reboot can renew interest in a series that has grown stale. Reboots act as a safe project for a studio, since a reboot with an established fanbase is less risky (in terms of expected profit) than an entirely original work, while at the same time allowing the studio to explore new demographics.

Television

A television series can return to production after cancellation or a long hiatus. Whereas a reboot disregards the previous continuity of a work, the term has also been used as a "catch all" phrase to categorize sequel series or general remakes due to the rise of such productions in the late 2010s.

A related concept is retooling, which is used to substantially change the premise of a series while keeping some of the core characters. Retools are usually part of an effort to forestall cancellation of a still running production.

Video games
Reboots and remakes are common in the video game industry. Remakes in video games are used to refresh the storyline and elements of the game and to take advantage of technology and features not available at the time of earlier entries.

See also
 Artistic license
 Canon (fiction)
 Prequel
 Reset button technique

References

 
Comics terminology
Continuity (fiction)
Film and video terminology
 
 
 
Television terminology
 
Video game terminology